The following outline is provided as an overview of and topical guide to the U.S. state of North Carolina.  Wikipedia:WikiProject North Carolina :Category:Top-importance North Carolina articles are indicated.

North Carolina – U.S. state on the Eastern Seaboard, bordering the North Atlantic Ocean in the Southeastern United States.  North Carolina was one of the original Thirteen Colonies and signed the United States Declaration of Independence on July 4, 1776.  North Carolina was the 12th of the original 13 states to approve the Constitution of the United States of America on January 2, 1788. North Carolina joined the Confederate States of America during the American Civil War from 1861 to 1865, and following the war was readmitted to the Union in 1868.

General reference 

 Names
 Common name: North Carolina
 Pronunciation: 
 Official name: State of North Carolina
 Abbreviations and name codes
 Postal symbol:  NC
 ISO 3166-2 code:  US-NC
 Internet second-level domain:  .nc.us
 Nicknames
 Old North State
 Tar Heel State
 Turpentine State
 Variety Vacationland
 Rip Van Winkle State
 Land of the Sky
 First in Flight State (currently used on license plates)
 Adjectivals: North Carolina, North Carolinian
 Demonym: North Carolinian

Geography of North Carolina 

Geography of North Carolina
 North Carolina is: a U.S. state, a federal state of the United States of America
 Location
 Northern hemisphere
 Western hemisphere
 Americas
 North America
 Anglo America
 Northern America
 United States of America
 Contiguous United States
 Eastern United States
 East Coast of the United States
 Southern United States
 Southeastern United States
 South Atlantic States
 Population of North Carolina: 10,439,388 (2020 U.S. Census)
 Area of North Carolina:
 Atlas of North Carolina
 :commons:Category:North Carolina

Places in North Carolina 

 Historic places in North Carolina
 National Historic Landmarks in North Carolina
 National Register of Historic Places listings in North Carolina
 Bridges on the National Register of Historic Places in North Carolina
 National Natural Landmarks in North Carolina
 List of National Park Service areas in North Carolina
 State parks in North Carolina

Environment of North Carolina 

 Climate of North Carolina
 Protected areas in North Carolina
 State forests of North Carolina
 Superfund sites in North Carolina
 Wildlife of North Carolina
 Fauna of North Carolina
 Birds of North Carolina
 Tidewater region of North Carolina

Natural geographic features of North Carolina 
 List of mountains in North Carolina
 List of rivers of North Carolina

Regions of North Carolina 
 Piedmont (United States)
 Eastern North Carolina
 Northeastern North Carolina
 Cape Fear (region)
 Western North Carolina
 Piedmont Triad

Administrative divisions of North Carolina 

 The 100 Counties of the State of North Carolina
 Municipalities in North Carolina
 Cities in North Carolina
 State capital of North Carolina:
 City nicknames in North Carolina
 Sister cities in North Carolina
 Unincorporated communities in North Carolina
 List of townships in North Carolina

Demography of North Carolina 

Demographics of North Carolina
 Slaves

Politics and government of North Carolina 

Government of North Carolina
 Form of government: U.S. state government
 United States congressional delegations from North Carolina
 North Carolina State Capitols
 Tryon Palace (1777)
 North Carolina State House (17941831)
 North Carolina State Capitol (18401961)
 North Carolina State Legislative Building (1963present)
 Elections in North Carolina
 Electoral reform in North Carolina
 Political party strength in North Carolina

Branches of the government in North Carolina

Executive branch of the government in North Carolina 
 Council of State of North Carolina
 Governor of North Carolina
 Lieutenant Governor of North Carolina
 North Carolina Commissioner of Agriculture
 North Carolina Attorney General
 Auditor of North Carolina
 North Carolina Commissioner of Labor
 North Carolina Commissioner of Insurance
 North Carolina Secretary of State
 North Carolina State Treasurer
 North Carolina Superintendent of Public Instruction
 North Carolina Cabinet
 North Carolina Department of Administration
 North Carolina Department of Commerce
 North Carolina Department of Environmental Quality
 North Carolina Department of Health and Human Services
 North Carolina Department of Information Technology
 North Carolina Department of Military and Veterans Affairs
 North Carolina Department of Natural and Cultural Resources
 North Carolina Department of Public Safety
 North Carolina Department of Revenue
 North Carolina Department of Transportation

Legislative branch of the government in North Carolina 
 North Carolina General Assembly (bicameral)
 Upper house: North Carolina Senate
 Lower house: House of Commons/House of Representatives
 List of North Carolina state legislatures (1777present)

Judicial branch of the government in North Carolina 
North Carolina Supreme Court
North Carolina Court of Appeals
North Carolina District Courts (45 districts)
 Federal Courts in North Carolina

County and City Governments in North Carolina 
 List of law enforcement agencies in North Carolina
 North Carolina justice of the peace
 North Carolina Councils of Governments
 :Category:Lists of mayors of places in North Carolina
 :Category:North Carolina city council members
 :Category:County officials in North Carolina
:Category:County commissioners in North Carolina
:Category:District attorneys in North Carolina
:Category:North Carolina sheriffs
:Category:Sheriffs' offices of North Carolina 
:Category:County police departments of North Carolina

Law and order in North Carolina 
Law of North Carolina
Constitution of North Carolina
Specific laws and judgements
 Cannabis in North Carolina
 Individuals executed in North Carolina
 Crime in North Carolina
 Gun laws in North Carolina
 Same-sex marriage in North Carolina

North Carolina military units 

Current
 North Carolina Air National Guard
 North Carolina Army National Guard

Revolutionary War
List of North Carolina militia units in the American Revolution
North Carolina Line
North Carolina state troops in the American Revolution

Civil War
 List of North Carolina Confederate Civil War units
 List of North Carolina Union Civil War regiments

History of North Carolina 
History of North Carolina

History of North Carolina, by period 
Pre-history
Indigenous peoples
Mississippian culture
Joara
Spanish colony of Florida, 1565–1763
Fort San Juan at Joara, 1567–1568
English Colony of Roanoke, 1585–1587
Colonial period
 Province of Carolina
 English, 1663–1707
 French colony of Louisiane, 1699–1763
 British, 1707–1712
 Province of North Carolina
 British,  1712–1776
 French and Indian War, 1754–1763
Treaty of Fontainebleau of 1762
Treaty of Paris of 1763
British Indian Reserve, 1763–1783
Royal Proclamation of 1763

Revolutionary War period
North Carolina Provincial Congress 1774-1776
Rowan Resolves 1774
Mecklenburg Resolves 1775
Tryon Resolves 1775
Halifax Resolves 1776
Cherokee–American wars, 1776–1794
United States Declaration of Independence, July 4, 1776
First General Assembly
Tenth state to ratify the Articles of Confederation and Perpetual Union, signed July 21, 1778
North Carolina in the American Revolutionary War April 19, 1775 – September 3, 1783
Treaty of Paris, September 3, 1783

Post Revolution
State of Franklin, 1784 
Hillsborough Convention of 1788 (U.S. Constitution)
Fayetteville Convention of 1789 (U.S. Constitution)
Twelfth State to ratify the Constitution of the United States of America on November 21, 1789
Southwest Territory, 1790
War of 1812, June 18, 1812 – March 23, 1815
Treaty of Ghent, December 24, 1814
Trail of Tears, 1830–1838
North Carolina Constitutional Convention of 1835
James K. Polk becomes 11th President of the United States on March 4, 1845

Civil War
American Civil War, April 12, 1861 – May 13, 1865
North Carolina in the American Civil War
Tenth state admitted to the Confederate States of America on May 21, 1861
Carolinas Campaign, January 5 – April 26, 1865

Post Civil War
Andrew Johnson becomes 17th President of the United States on April 15, 1865
North Carolina in Reconstruction, 1865–1868
Fourth former Confederate state readmitted to the United States on July 4, 1868
North Carolina Constitution of 1868
Kirk-Holden War, 1870

Modern era

History of North Carolina, by region 
By city

 History of Asheville
 History of Cary
 History of Chapel Hill
 History of Charlotte
 History of Concord
 History of Durham
 History of Fayetteville
 History of Gastonia
 History of Greensboro
 History of Greenville
 History of High Point
 History of Jacksonville
 History of Raleigh (capital)
 History of Rocky Mount
 Statesville
 History of Wilson
 History of Wilmington
 History of Winston-Salem

By county

 History of Alamance County
 History of Alexander County
 History of Alleghany County
 History of Anson County
 History of Ashe County
 History of Avery County
 History of Beaufort County
 History of Bertie County
 History of Bladen County
 History of Brunswick County
 History of Buncombe County
 History of Burke County
 History of Cabarrus County
 History of Caldwell County
 History of Camden County
 History of Carteret County
 History of Caswell County
 History of Catawba County
 History of Chatham County
 History of Cherokee County
 History of Chowan County
 History of Clay County
 History of Cleveland County
 History of Columbus County
 History of Craven County
 History of Cumberland County
 History of Currituck County
 History of Dare County
 History of Davidson County
 History of Davie County
 History of Duplin County
 History of Durham County
 History of Edgecombe County
 History of Forsyth County
 History of Franklin County
 History of Gaston County
 History of Gates County
 History of Graham County
 History of Granville County
 History of Greene County
 History of Guilford County
 History of Halifax County
 History of Harnett County
 History of Haywood County
 History of Henderson County
 History of Hertford County
 History of Hoke County
 History of Hyde County
 History of Iredell County
 History of Jackson County
 History of Johnston County
 History of Jones County
 History of Lee County
 History of Lenoir County
 History of Lincoln County
 History of Macon County
 History of Madison County
 History of Martin County
 History of McDowell County
 History of Mecklenburg County
 History of Mitchell County
 History of Montgomery County
 History of Moore County
 History of Nash County
 History of New Hanover County
 History of Northampton County
 History of Onslow County
 History of Orange County
 History of Pamlico County
 History of Pasquotank County
 History of Pender County
 History of Perquimans County
 History of Person County
 History of Pitt County
 History of Polk County
 History of Randolph County
 History of Richmond County
 History of Robeson County
 History of Rockingham County
 History of Rowan County
 History of Rutherford County
 History of Sampson County
 History of Scotland County
 History of Stanly County
 History of Stokes County
 History of Surry County
 History of Swain County
 History of Transylvania County
 History of Tyrrell County
 History of Union County
 History of Vance County
 History of Wake County
 History of Warren County
 History of Washington County
 History of Watauga County
 History of Wayne County
 History of Wilkes County
 History of Wilson County
 History of Wilson County
 History of Yadkin County
 History of Yancey County

Former counties:

 Washington County, North Carolina, established 1777
 Sullivan County, North Carolina, established 1779
 Davidson County, North Carolina, established 1783
 Greene County, North Carolina, established 1783
 Hawkins County, North Carolina, established 1786
 Sumner County, North Carolina, established 1786
 Tennessee County, established 1788, divided at Tennessee statehood in 1796 into Montgomery County, Tennessee and Robertson County, Tennessee
 Albemarle
 Bath
 Bute
 Dobbs
 Tryon

History of North Carolina, by subject 
 Effects of Hurricane Charley in North Carolina
 History of North Carolina State University
 History of slavery in North Carolina

Culture of North Carolina 

Culture of North Carolina
 Museums in North Carolina
 Religion in North Carolina
 The Church of Jesus Christ of Latter-day Saints in North Carolina
 Episcopal Diocese of North Carolina
 Scouting in North Carolina
 State symbols of North Carolina
 Flag of North Carolina
 Great Seal of the State of North Carolina
 Barbecue in North Carolina

The Arts in North Carolina 
 Music of North Carolina
 Theater in North Carolina
 North Carolina literature

Sports in North Carolina 

Sports in North Carolina
 Professional sports teams in North Carolina

Economy and infrastructure of North Carolina 

Economy of North Carolina
 Communications in North Carolina
 Newspapers in North Carolina
 Radio stations in North Carolina
 Television stations in North Carolina
 Energy in North Carolina
 Power stations in North Carolina
 Solar power in North Carolina
 Wind power in North Carolina
 Health care in North Carolina
 Hospitals in North Carolina
 Transportation in North Carolina
 Airports in North Carolina
 Railroads in North Carolina
 Highways in North Carolina

Education in North Carolina 

Education in North Carolina
 List of school districts in North Carolina
 List of high schools in North Carolina
 List of colleges and universities in North Carolina
 University of North Carolina system
 North Carolina Community College System

See also

Topic overview:
North Carolina

Index of North Carolina-related articles

References

External links 

North Carolina
North Carolina